Leptuca crenulata, the Mexican fiddler crab, is a species of American broad-front fiddler crab in the family Ocypodidae.

Leptuca crenulata was formerly in the genus Uca, but in 2016 it was placed in the genus Leptuca, a former subgenus of Uca.

References

Further reading

 

Ocypodoidea
Crustaceans described in 1877